La Bruja  ("The Witch") is a 1954 Mexican film. It was directed by Chano Urueta.

Plot
A brilliant doctor creates an incredible formula but refused to sell it to an important pharmaceutical company and the company in revenge, kills the doctor's daughter.   
The scientist consumed by a terrible pain, decided to plan a sinister  vengeance. In order to do so he found a horrible woman known as the witch. He used all his scientific knowledge to create a system to convert the woman into a beauty. The witch is introduced to the pharmaceutical company  with success and she fell in love with one of the top executives, but the problem is that the formula only lasts for a short period of time.

The ending will be anything but happy...

Cast
 Lilia del Valle - La Bruja (The Witch)
 Ramón Gay		
 Julio Villarreal
 Charles Rooner	
 Fernando Wagner
 Luis Aceves Castañeda
 José René Ruiz - Rene Ruiz 'Tun Tun'
 Ángel Di Stefani - Angel Stefani
 Guillermo Hernández - Guillermo Hernandez Lobo Negro
 Guillermina Téllez Girón		
 Diana Ochoa		
 Emilio Garibay		
 José Pardavé

External links
 
Plot

1954 films
1950s Spanish-language films
Films directed by Chano Urueta
Mexican black-and-white films
1950s Mexican films